Wates may refer to:

 Wates, the capital of Kulon Progo Regency in Indonesia
 Wates railway station, a railway station in Wates
 Wates Group, a UK construction company
 Cyril G. Wates (1883–1946), Canadian astronomer, climber and writer
 Darren Wates (born 1977), Australian cricketer

See also
 Waits (disambiguation)